Metallographeus is a genus of longhorn beetles of the subfamily Lamiinae, containing the following species:

 Metallographeus albolineatus Breuning, 1970
 Metallographeus angolensis Breuning, 1978
 Metallographeus ghanaensis Breuning, 1978

References

Desmiphorini